The North Adelaide Lacrosse Club was founded on 22 March 1887, and is the oldest continually existing lacrosse club in South Australia. Nobel Laureate Sir William Henry Bragg, previously a member of the Adelaide Lacrosse Club, was a founding member of North Adelaide as well as the Adelaide University Lacrosse Club later in 1889. NALC are currently located in the suburb of Gepps Cross.

Premierships 
North Adelaide had early success in the South Australian Lacrosse Association, but have not won an A Grade premiership since 1960.

A Grade Premierships:
 1888, 1889, 1897, 1909, 1910, 1927, 1928, 1929, 1960

North Adelaide also unofficially won the premiership in 1887 before the South Australian Lacrosse Association was formally constituted.

See also 

 Lacrosse in Australia
 List of South Australian Lacrosse Premiers
 Adelaide University Lacrosse Club
 List of the oldest lacrosse teams

Notes

External links
 

Lacrosse teams in Australia
Sporting clubs in Adelaide
1887 establishments in Australia
Lacrosse clubs established in 1887